Lanistes ciliatus is a species of large freshwater snail, an aquatic gastropod mollusk with a gill and an operculum in the family Ampullariidae, the apple snails.

It is endemic to Kenya.

References

Freshwater snails
Ampullariidae
Endemic molluscs of Kenya
Taxonomy articles created by Polbot